La Ville-Dieu is a railway station in La Ville-Dieu-du-Temple, Occitanie, France. The station is on the Bordeaux–Sète railway. The station is served by TER (local) services operated by SNCF.

Train services
The following services currently call at La Ville-Dieu:
local service (TER Occitanie) Agen–Montauban–Toulouse

References

Railway stations in Tarn-et-Garonne